The 2013 Catalan motorcycle Grand Prix was the sixth round of the 2013 MotoGP season. It was held at the Circuit de Catalunya in Montmeló on 16 June 2013.

Report
Dani Pedrosa took his second consecutive MotoGP pole position ahead of Cal Crutchlow and Jorge Lorenzo. Pedrosa set a new circuit record for MotoGP with a 1:40.893, which beat his former teammate Casey Stoner's record of 1:41.186 set in 2008. Lorenzo went on to win the race, ahead of pole sitter Pedrosa, and Marc Márquez. Valentino Rossi finished in fourth place, after the collision with Álvaro Bautista in Italy. Javier del Amor scored a point in his only MotoGP start, being called up as a last minute replacement for Hiroshi Aoyama. 

Turn 10, a right hander after the back straight, had caught out many riders due to the hot temperatures on race day and caused many retirements during the first few laps of the race.

In Moto2, Pol Espargaró took pole position, and went on to win the race, ahead of Esteve Rabat and Switzerland's Thomas Lüthi, who took his first podium of the season.

In Moto3, Luis Salom took his second successive victory from pole position, ahead of Álex Rins and Maverick Viñales.

Classification

MotoGP
Hiroshi Aoyama was replaced by Javier del Amor after the third practice session.

Moto2

Moto3

Championship standings after the race (MotoGP)
Below are the standings for the top five riders and constructors after round six has concluded.

Riders' Championship standings

Constructors' Championship standings

 Note: Only the top five positions are included for both sets of standings.

References

Catalan motorcycle Grand Prix
Catalan
Catalan Motorcycle Grand Prix
motorcycle
Catalan motorcycle Grand Prix